LaShawn is a given name. Notable people with the given name include:

LaShawn Daniels, American songwriter
LaShawn Merritt (born 1986), American track and field athlete
La Shawn K. Ford, American politician
Lashawn Tináh Jefferies (born 1994), American actress

See also
La'Sean
LeSean
LeShon